Lohsa (German) or Łaz (Upper Sorbian) is a municipality (German: Einheitsgemeinde) in the district of Bautzen, in Saxony, Germany.

The municipality is part of the recognized Sorbian settlement area in Saxony. Upper Sorbian has an official status next to German, all villages bear names in both languages.

Villages 
Several villages belong to the municipality (names given in German/Upper Sorbian):

 Dreiweibern/Tři Žony
 Driewitz/Drěwcy
 Friedersdorf/Bjedrichecy
 Groß Särchen/Wulke Ždźary
 Hermsdorf/Spree/Hermanecy
 Koblenz/Koblicy
 Lippen/Lipiny
 Litschen/Złyčin
 Lohsa/Łaz
 Mortka/Mortkow
 Riegel/Roholń
 Steinitz/Šćeńca
 Tiegling/Tyhelc
 Weißig/Wysoka
 Weißkollm/Běły Chołmc

Economy and Infrastructure

Education
The municipality of Lohsa has a primary school in Groß Särchen and a secondary school.

Traffic 
To the east of the municipality runs the B 156, to the west the B 96, via which the B 97 to the northwest can be reached. Lohsa is connected to the Niesky-Hoyerswerda(-Falkenberg (Elster)-Roßlau (Elbe)) railway line by a demand stop. The RB 64 line (Hoyerswerda-Görlitz) operates here as Seenland-Neisse-Shuttle.

See also
Speicherbecken Lohsa

References

External links

Populated places in Bautzen (district)